The 1889 Virginia gubernatorial election was held on November 5, 1889 to elect the governor of Virginia.

Results

References

1889
Virginia
gubernatorial
November 1889 events